Events in the year 1696 in Norway.

Incumbents
Monarch: Christian V

Events
Bentse Brug is established.
The first Store Færder Lighthouse is established.

Arts and literature

Tydal Church was built.

Births

Deaths

12 December – Johan Caspar von Cicignon, military officer (born c.1625).

See also

References